Lars Olsson Smith (12 October 1836 in Kiaby – 9 December 1913 in Karlskrona), also L.O. Smith, was a Swedish spirits manufacturer and politician. He was called "The King of Spirits" (Brännvinskungen) because of his domination of spirits production in Stockholm during the end of the 19th century. He started the production of Absolut Rent Brännvin which was later renamed Absolut Vodka.

Biography

At the age of 8, Lars Olsson Smith got a position in a general store in Karlshamn after his father's bankruptcy and was so well treated by his foster father consul Carl Smith that he took the name Smith. From 1850, he had employment in Stockholm first in the general store, then with a shipping agent. In 1858, he established an agency for a number of distilleries in Scania and Blekinge as well as a modern facility on Reimersholme. The distilleries Smith installed there made him rich by producing spirits with an unusually low fusel alcohol value. The most well known was the tiodubblat renat ('ten times purified') which ran the communal distilleries out of business. As a result, the city of Stockholm tried to hamper his success. Smith however was a shrewd and resourceful businessman, placing the distillery on Reimersholme outside the city limits. He sold his products from the Fjäderholmarna islands where he had boats commuting to serve purified spirits to the people of Stockholm.

In 2011, a memorial stone was erected in Kiaby, the village where Smith was born.

External links
Lo Smith website

References

 Nordisk familjebok, Uggleupplagan (1917), Smith, Lars Olsson 

1836 births
1913 deaths
Swedish businesspeople
Members of the Första kammaren